The Deperdussin T was a French  monoplane built by Société Pour les Appareils Deperdussin, (later to become S.P.A.D.).

Specifications (T)

References

Further reading

T
Single-engined tractor aircraft
1910s French military reconnaissance aircraft
Shoulder-wing aircraft
Aircraft first flown in 1912
Rotary-engined aircraft